Adam Cerra (born 7 October 1999) is a professional Australian rules footballer playing for the Carlton Football Club in the Australian Football League (AFL). He formerly played for the Fremantle Football Club between 2018 and 2021.

AFL career

After an impressive, but injury riddled junior career for Norwood in the Eastern Football League and Eastern Ranges in the TAC Cup, he was then selected by Fremantle with their second selection, fifth overall, in the 2017 AFL national draft.

Cerra made his AFL debut for Fremantle in the second round of the 2018 AFL season. He was awarded the round 16 nomination for the 2018 AFL Rising Star award.

Cerra proved to be an important player for Fremantle, finishing 3rd in the club's best and fairest in 2020, and 5th in 2021. At the end of the 2021 season, Cerra requested a trade to Carlton. He was traded on 7 October to Carlton for Pick 6 and a future third-round selection.

References

External links

 
WAFL Player Profile and Statistics

1999 births
Living people
Fremantle Football Club players
Carlton Football Club players
Eastern Ranges players
Australian rules footballers from Victoria (Australia)
People educated at Norwood Secondary College
People educated at Wesley College (Victoria)
Peel Thunder Football Club players